The Boekentoren (Dutch for Book Tower) is a famous building located in Ghent, Belgium, designed by the Belgian architect Henry van de Velde. It is part of the Ghent University Library and currently houses 3 million books. The Boekentoren is directly adjacent to the Blandijn, the buildings of the Faculty of Arts and Philosophy.

History
In 1933 the famous Flemish architect Henry van de Velde (1863–1957) was commissioned to design a building for the Library and the Institutes of Art History, Veterinarian Studies  and Pharmaceutical sciences of the Ghent University (Universiteit Gent) on the premises of the former De Vreese Alley on the Blandijnberg. Situated on the highest ground in the city, the site offered the architect a unique opportunity to give to Ghent its fourth tower, not for the ringing of bells this time, but for books. Together with the 3 towers, the so-called "Tower of Wisdom" helped Ghent realising the dream the town had since it hosted the World's Fair in 1913 of creating a "Parade of Towers". The famous three towers of the Middle Ages: the Saint-Nicolas Church, the Belfry and the Saint Bavo Cathedral and the modernist Booktower.

Constructed in concrete – an innovation in those days – using the then equally innovative technique of sliding shuttering, the tower was given the shape of a Greek cross to symbolize the connection between time and space, and merging heaven and earth. Twenty storeys above and four below ground level accommodate a line-up of some 46 kilometres of printed material, or over 3 million items. Supporting the vertical lines of the tower and the books on the shelves are the horizontal lines of the open books on the long tables of the magnificent reading-room, the rectangular courtyard that bathes in daylight, and the reading-room for manuscripts, safely shielded from daylight at the north side of the edifice. The tower was inaugurated in 1942 and recognized as a monument in 1992.

Restoration
Almost 70 years after its completion, a thorough restoration started, including the famous Belvedère and the gorgeous interiors. The occasion, however, is also used to make the tower more accessible to the general public. On the other hand, the building will be made to meet the demands of modern library management, especially as far as protection and management of  the collection (air conditioning, replacement of obsolete by modern and more efficient provisions) are concerned. The tower will, therefore, not only be restored, but also thoroughly updated. A three floor underground repository is built under the inner garden; it will be completed in 2014 so the books can move from the tower to the underground and the concrete skin of the tower can be replaced. The entire operation is the work of a team around the architects Robbrecht and Daem. Restoration started in 2012 and will last at least until 2017, when Ghent University celebrates its 200th  birthday.

The restoration began with the private person Andre Singer who initiated a campaign to make the university aware of the great architectural value of the building, and of the need of restoration. The then head of the library, Sylvia Van Peteghem, took on the difficult job of finding University money and other funding for the full restoration which will probably be completed in 2021.

Trivia
During World War II the tower was taken by the German Army because of the great city (and airplane) view they had over there.

The Booktower houses about 46 kilometers of books and other material.

In 2007 the Flemish Television Centre VRT has nominated the belvedère of the book tower for their program "Monumentenstrijd". This  "Battle between Monuments" was based on the popular BBC show Restoration, which had many viewers in Belgium (a belvedère – an observation post on the roof with an immense panorama – functions as a popular feature in large-scale public buildings.)

On the 3rd of April 2013 the Booktower figured in the Google logo to celebrate the 150th birthday of Henry van de Velde.

See also
 Ghent University Library

Photo gallery

External links 

 .
 .
 .
 .
 .
 .
 .

Ghent University
Towers in Belgium
Academic libraries in Belgium
Library buildings completed in 1936
Buildings and structures in Ghent
Henry van de Velde buildings
Tourist attractions in Ghent